Gion-shinbashi-kita Station  is a HRT station on the Astram Line, located in 4-43-28, Nishihara, Asaminami-ku, Hiroshima.

Platforms

Around station
Japan National Route 54 (Gion Shindo)
Gion Shinbashi
Ōta River
NHK Hiroshima Radio Station

History
Opened on August 20, 1994.

References

See also
Astram Line
Hiroshima Rapid Transit

Astram Line stations